Bamseom is a pair of islets in the River Han in Seoul, South Korea. Bamseom means "chestnut island". They remain connected to one another by a narrow strip of sedimentary silt. Seogang Bridge passes directly over the western islet, though there is no access available, as the islets have been left as a natural sanctuary. There is, however, an observation point for bird-watching. Migratory birds use the islets often and among the birds which can be seen are mallards, great egrets, mandarins, common kestrels, and Eastern spot-billed ducks.

History
The islands were inhabited until the Seogang Bridge was built over them, using the west islet as a support for one of the beams. Most of the inhabitants of Bamseom in the Joseon era were shipbuilders.

February 10, 1968, Bamseom was detonated for the purpose of collecting rubble required for the construction of the embankment for the development of Yeouido, and the island was divided into upper Bamseom (northwest) and Lower Bamseom.

Ecosystem
Bamseom is a key location for a wide variety of bird species, such as the Mandarin duck, and it serves as a shelter for migratory birds during the winter. There are also about 108 species of plants on the island, such as willow trees and itch reeds. Additionally, Bamseom is an excellent place for children living in the city to experience nature. In 1999, the Seoul metropolitan government registered Bamseon as a
"natural preservation district".

West Islet
This is the more forested of the two islets, particularly at the western point.

East Islet
This islet contains a bay which opens onto the strip of water between the islets. This bay has largely silted up and is therefore marshy and contains many reeds and reed-dwelling organisms.

Gallery

Park
Bamseon has extensive facilities for tourists and visitors. So far, 6 observatory platforms and direction boards for visitors have been erected. The facility allows citizens to visit from December to February. This timetable was largely set by a 1999 governmental decision, as observing the migration of birds is important to ornithologists and naturalists.

Films
Bamseon is the primary location in the 2009 Korean film Castaway on the Moon in which a man (Jung Jae-young) decides to commit suicide by jumping into the Han river, only to find himself washed ashore and stranded on the island.

See also

 Desert island
 List of islands

References

Uninhabited islands of South Korea
River islands of South Korea
Parks in Seoul
Islands of Seoul
Ramsar sites in South Korea